Aristote M'Boma (born 30 June 1994) is a Congolese former professional footballer who played as a forward. He also holds Finnish citizenship.

Career
On 12 November 2018, M'Boma joined fellow Veikkausliiga side IFK Mariehamn from SJK on a two-year contract. Following rape accusations against him, M'Boma was released by Mariehamn in May 2020.

Personal life
In July 2020, M'Boma was given a four-year prison sentence for two counts of aggravated rape.

Career statistics

References

External links
MLSZ

1994 births
Living people
Footballers from Kinshasa
Democratic Republic of the Congo footballers
Democratic Republic of the Congo emigrants to Finland
Association football forwards
FC Honka players
Újpest FC players
Pallohonka players
AC Oulu players
FC Lahti players
Seinäjoen Jalkapallokerho players
IFK Mariehamn players
Kakkonen players
Veikkausliiga players
Nemzeti Bajnokság I players
Finnish expatriate footballers
Expatriate footballers in Hungary
Finnish expatriate sportspeople in Hungary
Finnish prisoners and detainees
Naturalized citizens of Finland
Finnish people convicted of rape
Prisoners and detainees of Finland